A Jazz Message is a jazz album recorded by Art Blakey's Quartet in 1964. The album was Blakey's second and last album for the Impulse! label.

Track listing
"Cafe" (Blakey, Stitt) – 5:37
"Just Knock On My Door" (Blakey, Stitt) – 7:00
"Summertime" (George Gershwin, DuBose Heyward) – 4:42
"Blues Back" (Tyner) – 5:23
"Sunday" (Chester Conn, Nick Drake, Benny Krueger, Ned Miller, Jule Styne) – 7:23
"The Song Is You" (Jerome Kern, Oscar Hammerstein II) – 5:06

Personnel
Art Blakey – drums
Sonny Stitt – tenor saxophone (1, 3, 5), alto saxophone (2, 4, 6)
McCoy Tyner – piano
Art Davis – bass

Production notes:
Bob Thiele – producer
Rudy Van Gelder – engineer

References 

Art Blakey albums
1964 albums
Impulse! Records albums
Albums produced by Bob Thiele
Albums recorded at Van Gelder Studio